Giovanni De Carolis (born 21 August 1984) is an Italian professional boxer who held the WBA super-middleweight title in 2016.

Professional career
De Carolis made his professional debut on 17 November 2007, scoring a second-round stoppage over Marian Tomcany. On 14 June 2008, De Carolis fought outside of his native Italy for the first time, travelling to Ukraine and suffering his first defeat against then-reigning IBF Youth middleweight champion Max Bursak, who stopped him in eight rounds. De Carolis' first opportunity at a major regional championship came on 30 January 2010, for the vacant European Union super-middleweight title. He lost a twelve-round majority decision to Lolenga Mock.

De Carolis vs. Feigenbutz 
On 17 October 2015, De Carolis inched closer to a major world title when he fought Vincent Feigenbutz for the WBA interim super-middleweight title. Feigenbutz won a close unanimous decision with judges' scores of 115–113, 115–113 and 114–113, but the result was seen by some observers as controversial.

De Carolis vs. Feigenbutz II 
A rematch took place on 9 January 2016, with De Carolis avenging his defeat by winning the WBA (Regular) super-middleweight title.

De Carlolis vs. Zeuge 
On 23 July, 2016, De Carolis fought Tyron Zeuge for the second time in a row but lost the fight via knockout in the final round.

De Carolis vs. Richards 
O n 15 May, 2021, Lerrone Richards beat De Carolis by unanimous decision in their 12 round contest. Richards was ranked #10 by the WBO at super middleweight. The scorecards read 119-109, 120-108, 120-108 in favor of Richards.

De Carolis vs. Scardina 
On 13 May, 2022, De Carolis beat Daniele Scardina by technical knockout in the 5th round. Scardina was ranked #8 by the IBF and #9 by the WBO at super middleweight at the time.

Professional boxing record

References

External links

Giovanni De Carlois - Profile, News Archive & Current Rankings at Box.Live

|-

1984 births
Living people
Middleweight boxers
Italian male boxers
World Boxing Association champions
Boxers from Rome
World super-middleweight boxing champions